Andrew Deer  is an English taekwondo athlete.

In 2015, Deer representing Great Britain, competed in the -74kg category in the 2015 World Taekwondo Championships in May 2015. In 2017, he became a National Development Coach on the Sports England funded Programme. In 2018 after working as project lead coach, Great Britain Taekwondo was awarded sufficient funding for a full to programme, and as a result of the funding, he became Great Britain's first Taekwondo Paralymic Coach.

References

External links
 

Year of birth missing (living people)
Living people
English male taekwondo practitioners
European Taekwondo Championships medalists
Commonwealth Taekwondo Championships medallists
Sportspeople from Tamworth, Staffordshire
Black British sportspeople